Croydon railway station is located on the Grange and Outer Harbor lines. Situated in the western Adelaide suburb of Croydon, it is 4.2 kilometres from Adelaide station.

History
Croydon station opened in 1888, with the station buildings and platforms transferred from the former Torrens Bridge station. The station has been unattended since 1981. The provides easy access to the popular Queen Street/Elizabeth Street cafe and retro shop strip, as well as a children's park. Wheelchair access ramps and sheltered seating areas are located on both platforms.

Lights displaying the warning 'Caution More Than One Train' have been installed at pedestrian crossings near the station as part of an Adelaide-wide crossing safety upgrade program. These lights are illuminated when more than one train is due to warn pedestrians waiting to cross the line that another train will be following quickly after the first has passed.

Whilst it had been previously proposed that as part of an upgrade to South Road, the station would be elevated and potentially relocated to the east as part of a grade separation project, the final design adopted a shorter rail overpass option allowing the station to remain in its current location.

Upgrade 
In October 2017 it was announced that the station would be demolished in its entirety to remove a speed restriction on passing trains due to the relatively narrow width of the rail corridor in between the platforms. The rebuilt station features completely new platforms that are the same height as the train floor, as well as new shelters, seating and lighting. The pedestrian crossing points at the adjacent level crossing was also upgraded to 'active crossings' meaning that gates will open and close automatically to prevent pedestrians from entering the rail corridor whilst trains are passing. Construction was originally expected to be completed by the reopening of the train line in January 2018, however, works continued until May with the platforms remaining open for train passengers during most of this time.

Services by platform

References

External links

Railway stations in Adelaide
Railway stations in Australia opened in 1888